Jingdezhen Luojia Airport  is an airport serving Jingdezhen, a city in the province of Jiangxi in the People's Republic of China.

Facilities

Airlines and destinations

See also
 List of airports in the People's Republic of China

References

Airports in Jiangxi